Bernard Quentin Augustus Pitts CBE, often known by his initials as B. Q. Pitts, is a Belizean politician and a member of the United Democratic Party of Belize.

Career
Pitts was Speaker of the House of Representatives in the Parliament from 1993 to 1998. He is also a lawyer in private practice, the senior partner in the law firm of Pitts and Elrington along with his Cabinet colleague Wilfred Elrington. Following the Belize Constitution (Seventh Amendment) Bill which removed the Constitution of Belize's requirement that the Attorney-General be a member of the House or Senate, PM Dean Barrow appointed him to the position of AG in place of Elrington. However, his term was marked by poor relations with the Belize Bar Association, particularly over the issue of the Belize Constitution (Ninth Amendment) Bill, and in 2012 Elrington took over the post of AG again, taking everything back to the situation as it was before 2008. Pitts was appointed Commander of the Order of the British Empire (CBE) in the 2012 New Year Honours.

Personal life
Bernard Q. Pitts Sr. is married to Valda Icene Pitts. Pitts's daughter Sharon Pitts-Robateau is also a partner and currently the head of his law firm. Pitts' son Bernard Q. Pitts Jr. is a politician. He ran and was elected under the United Democratic Party banner for a seat on the Belize City Council in the 2012 elections, .

References 

Year of birth missing (living people)
Living people
Attorneys-General of Belize
Commanders of the Order of the British Empire
United Democratic Party (Belize) politicians
Speakers of the House of Representatives (Belize)